The Guadalajara Macrobús (branded as Mi Macro) is a bus rapid transit (BRT) system in Guadalajara, Jalisco, Mexico. The initiation of work on the system was announced by Jalisco Governor Emilio González Márquez on February 29, 2008.  The system was launched on March 11, 2009 by him and Mexican President Felipe Calderón Hinojosa.

Lines
The initial Macrobús line runs  along Calzada Independencia and Gobernador Curiel with a total of 27 stations, including two terminals: Mirador (northern terminus, in Guadalajara) and Fray Angélico (southern terminus, in Tlaquepaque). The line intersects the Guadalajara light rail system (LRT) Line 2 at San Juan de Dios station. After the LRT Line 3 was completed in 2016, a second transfer point was created at the station immediately south, Bicentenario (BRT) / Independencia (LRT-3).

The initial Macrobús BRT line has been renamed Mi Macro Calzada to distinguish it from a forthcoming perimeter BRT line running along the  ring road, which will begin service in 2021. The periphery line is named Mi Macro Periférico and includes 42 stations over a  route. The Periférico line, formerly nicknamed Peribús, is projected to serve 364,000 daily riders; it was first funded in January 2017 from Fondo Nacional de Infraestructura (Fonadin, the National Infrastructure Fund) with a grant of 660.8 million pesos, subsidizing a larger contribution from the Jalisco state government. Work on the Periférico line began in November 2019, and is projected to complete in 2021.

Calzada

The stations on the Calzada line (from north to south) are: 

 Mirador (Express)
 Huentitán
 Zoológico
 Independencia Norte (Express)
 San Patricio (Express)
 Igualdad
 Monumental
 Monte Olivette
 Circunvalación (Express)
 Ciencias de la Salud
 Juan Álvarez (Express)
 Alameda
 San Juan de Dios (Express; transfer to LRT Line 2)
 Bicentenario (Express; transfer to LRT Line 3)
 La Paz
 Niños Héroes (Express)
 Agua Azul
 Ciprés
 Héroes de Nacozari
 Lázaro Cárdenas (Express)
 El Deán
 Zona Industrial
 López de Legazpi
 Clemente Orozco (Express)
 Artes Plasticas
 Escultura (Express)
 Fray Angélico (Express)

Regular service takes approximately 46 minutes each way and operates from 5:00 AM to 11:00 PM. Limited-stop service (38 minutes each way) operates from 5:00 AM to 9:00 PM, connecting the stations noted as "Express" above. Typical headways are 8 minutes, with 5 minute headways during rush hours.

Periférico

The stations on the Periférico line (counterclockwise) are: 

 Barranca de Huentitán
 Zoológico Guadalajara
 Independencia Norte (transfer to BRT Calzada)
 Lomas del Paraíso
 Rancho Nuevo
 La Experiencia
 El Batán
 Periférico Norte (transfer to LRT Line 1)
 La Cantera
 Tabachines
 Constitución
 Centro Cultural Universitario
 San Isidro
 Periférico Belenes (transfer to LRT Line 3)
 Tuzanía
 Santa Margarita
 Acueducto
 5 de Mayo
 San Juan de Ocotán
 Vallarta (transfer to SiTren L1)
 Estadio Chivas
 Ciudad Judicial
 Ciudad Granja
 Parque Metropolitano
 Chapalita Inn
 El Colli
 Felipe Ruvalcaba
 Miramar
 Mariano Otero
 El Briseño
 Agrícola
 López Mateos
 ITESO
 Terminal Sur de Autobuses
 Periférico Sur (transfer to LRT Line 1)
 San Sebastianito
 8 de Julio
 Toluquilla
 Adolf Horn
 Artesanos
 Las Pintas
 Carretera a Chapala

Under the original plan, there were 53 stations served by a fleet of 105  (nominal length) articulated buses.

Proposed expansion
Additional lines were planned and were scheduled to open in 2010, soon after the opening of Macrobús Line 1. These included:

Macrobús Line 2 would run along Avenida Ávila Camacho and Calzada Revolución from Doctor Ángel Leaño in Zapopan to the new central bus terminal in Tlaquepaque. This route was later used for LRT Line 3.
Macrobús Line 3 would run along Calzada del Obrero (Fed. 15) and Calzada Jesús González Gallo (Fed. 23) from Juan Pablo and Periferico to Glorieta El Álamo in Tlaquepaque. This line will eventually be extended to the Guadalajara International Airport in Tlajomulco along Fed. 44.

The first of the proposed lines was a  subset of the present Periférico line. Other proposed lines were largely laid out along radial spokes and included:
 Lázaro Cárdenas: serving 129,000 daily passengers on a  similar to the earlier proposed Line 3 along Fed. 15 and Fed. 23
 Lopez Mateos: 54,000 passengers, 
 8 de Julio: 88,000 passengers, parallel to the southern half of LRT Line 1
 Vallarta: 38,000 passengers, acting as a western extension to LRT Line 2
 Gallo y Michel: 24,000 passengers,

Fleet

The initial Macrobús fleet included 41 blue articulated Volvo 7300 BRT buses, which are built on the Volvo B12M chassis and compliant with the Euro IV emissions standard. Mexico City also uses Volvo 7300 BRT buses for the Metrobús BRT system, but the Mexico City Volvo 7300 BRT buses are  bi-articulated buses, while the Guadalajara BRT system uses  single-articulated buses. 27 of the 41 were refurbished by July 2021 to extend their life by five years.

In 2014, Guadalajara added four red articulated DINA S.A. Brighter (stylized as BRighTer to emphasize its use in BRT systems) buses to the Macrobús fleet. The newer DINA buses are compliant with the stricter Euro V emissions standard, and are equipped with a Cummins ISM 10.8L six-cylinder engine and a six-speed Allison Transmission. Neither the Volvo nor DINA buses are equipped with air conditioning.

For the Periférico Line, Macrobús will use 37 articulated buses built on the Mercedes-Benz O 500 MA 2836 chassis, bodied by Busscar. The O 500 MA 2836 is also compliant with the Euro V emissions standard and is equipped with a six-cylinder OM 457 diesel engine.

Impact and ridership
As of February 2008, there were 130 bus routes running along Calzada Independencia and Gobernador Curiel, serviced by more than 2,000 buses. The goal of the BRT is to replace all non-BRT buses along the route. Many routes will be eliminated altogether and others altered so as to cross the BRT route and serve as feeder buses.

It is expected that upon the initial route's launch, the BRT system will achieve a daily ridership of over 174,000 passengers.

References

Further reading
State of Jalisco Press Release, "Cuenta Jalisco con visión de movilidad urbana necesaria" (February 29, 2008)
Héctor Padilla, "Aseguran que BRT moverá más pasajeros que el Tren Ligero y bajará la polución", El Mural (March 1, 2008)

External links

Official Macrobús site
State of Jalisco Macrobus photo gallery

Mi Macro
Transport companies established in 2009